The Housing Act of 1954, passed during the Dwight D. Eisenhower Administration, comprised a series of amendments to the National Housing Act of 1934. Referred to within the legislation simply as the "National Housing Act", the program was managed by the Federal Housing Administration (FHA), an agency created by the 1934 Act. Previous amendments to the 1934 Act were made in 1937 and 1949. 

The 1954 Act provided funding for 140,000 units of public housing, giving preferential treatment to families that would be relocated for slum eradication or revitalization. 

In 1965, federal housing programs came under the purview of the new United States Department of Housing and Urban Development (HUD).

See also 
 Mill Creek Valley § Urban renewal project

References

External links 

 HUD Historical Background

1958 in American law
83rd United States Congress
Public housing in the United States
United States federal housing legislation